The following is a timeline of the history of the city of Seville, Andalusia, Spain.

Prior to 18th century

 491 – Cathedral of Seville is built
 600 – Isidore of Seville becomes bishop.
 630 – Isidore of Seville compiles encyclopedia Etymologiae (approximate date).
 713 – Musa bin Nusayr in power.
 829 – Mosque built.
 844 – City raided by Vikings
 1023 – Abbadid Taifa of Seville established.
 1147 - Almohades take power.
 1181 – Alcázar (fort) construction begins.
 1198 – Minaret built.
 1247 – Siege of Seville begins.
 1248 – Seville incorporated into the Christian Kingdom of Castile under Ferdinand III.
 1252 – Seville Shipyard built.
 1477 – Printing press in use.
 1503 – Casa de Contratación (trade agency) established.
 1505 - University of Seville founded as "Colegio Santa María de Jesús".
 1507 - Seville Cathedral consecrated.
 1519 - Magellan embarks on circumnavigation expedition.
 1521 – Via Crucis to the Cruz del Campo laid out.
 1543 –  established.
 1563 – Court of Philip II relocated from Seville to Madrid.
 1598 – Merchants exchange built.
 1627 – Flood.
 1630 – Artist Zurbarán settles in Seville.
 1647 – Great Plague of Seville begins.
 1670 – Real Maestranza de Caballería de Sevilla (a chivalric order) established.
 1682 – University of Navigators building construction begins.
 1683 – Flood.

18th–19th centuries
 1717 – Casa de Contratación relocated from Seville to Cádiz.
 1729
 Court of Philip V relocated to Seville.
 Treaty of Seville signed in Seville.
 1758 – Royal Tobacco Factory begins operating.
 1785 – General Archive of the Indies established.
 1800 - Outbreak of yellow fever kills 30,000.
 1810 – February: French occupation begins.
 1812 – French occupation ends.
 1842 – Population: 100,498.
 1843 – City besieged by forces of Espartero.
 1852 – Triana Bridge built.
 1869 – City wall dismantled.
 1881 – Plaza de toros de la Real Maestranza de Caballería de Sevilla (bullring) built.
 1890 – Sevilla Football Club formed.
 1893 – María Luisa Park established.
 1896
  built at the Prado de San Sebastián.
 28 October: Cyclone.
 1897 – Population: 146,205.
 1900 – Population: 148,315.

20th century
 1901 –  (railway station) opens.
 1902 – Burial site of Christopher Columbus relocated to Seville from Cuba.
 1905
 Sevilla FC officially registered with the local government.
  built.
 1907 
 Real Betis football club formed.
 Ship canal completed from the Punta de los Remedios to the Punta del Verde.
 1915 –  (airport) built.
 1920 – Population: 205,529.
 1926 –  (bridge) built.
 1928 – Plaza de España built.
 1929
 Ibero-American Exposition of 1929 held.
 Estadio Municipal Heliópolis, later known as Estadio Benito Villamarín, opens.
 Lope de Vega Theatre opens.
 1931 –  (bridge) built.
 1933 – Seville Airport (Aeropuerto de San Pablo) opens.
 1936 – July 1936 military uprising in Seville.
 1950 – Population: 376,627.
 1959 – Seville Public Library established.
 1979 – Luis Uruñuela becomes mayor.
 1981
 Regional Government of Andalusia headquartered in Seville.
 Population: 653,833.
 1983
 21 December: Last and decisive qualifier match for UEFA Euro 1984 held: Spain 12–1 Malta.
 Manuel del Valle becomes mayor.
 1987 – UNESCO World Heritage Site in Seville established.
 1990
 Royal Seville Symphony Orchestra formed.
  (bridge) built.
 1991
 Teatro de la Maestranza (opera house) opens.
  opens
  (railway station) opens.
 San Bernardo railway station opens.
 Seville Airport new terminal opens.
  (bridge) built.
 Alejandro Rojas-Marcos becomes mayor.
 Guitar Legends festival held.
 Puente del Centenario (bridge) built.
 1992
 Madrid–Seville high-speed rail line begins operating.
 Alamillo Bridge and Puente de la Barqueta (bridge) built.
  opens.
 Seville Expo '92 held.
 Institución Colombina established.
 Torre de la Plata restored.
 1993 – Alamillo Park opens.
 1994 –  (festival) held.
 1995 – Soledad Becerril becomes mayor.
 1998
 First  festival held.
  opens.
 Nervión Plaza mall and cinema open.
 1999
 Plaza de Armas reopens as a mall and cinema.
 Alfredo Sánchez Monteseirín becomes mayor.
 Estadio de La Cartuja built.
 7th World Championships in Athletics held.

21st century
 2003 – 2003 UEFA Cup Final between Celtic and Porto held at the Estadio de La Cartuja.
 2004
 Starbucks opens its first establishment in the city.
 First  held.
 2004 Davis Cup finals held at the Estadio de La Cartuja.
 2007
  pedestrianized.
 Sevici bicycle service begins operating.
 MetroCentro tram line begins operating.
 2009 – Seville Metro begins operating.
 2010 –  reopens.
 2011
 Metropol Parasol erected.
 Juan Ignacio Zoido becomes mayor.
 2011 Davis Cup finals held at the Estadio de La Cartuja.
 Population: 703,021.
 2012
  reopens as a museum.
  reopens as a public space.
 2014 – Alamillo Park expanded.
 2015
 Torre Sevilla skyscraper erected.
 Juan Espadas becomes mayor.
 2016 – Hard Rock Cafe opens its first restaurant in the city.
 2018 – Torre Sevilla shopping mall opens.

See also
 History of Seville
 
 Timeline of the Muslim presence in the Iberian Peninsula, circa 8th-15th century CE
 Timelines of other cities in the autonomous community of Andalusia: Almería, Cádiz, Córdoba, Granada, Jaén, Jerez de la Frontera, Málaga
 List of municipalities in Andalusia

References

This article incorporates information from the Spanish Wikipedia and French Wikipedia.

Bibliography

Published in 19th century
 
 
 
 
 

Published in 20th century
 
 
 
 
 
 
 
 
 
 
 

Published in 21st century

External links

 Map of Seville, 1943
 
 Europeana. Items related to Seville, various dates.
 Digital Public Library of America. Items related to Seville, various dates

 
seville